The A170 is an A road in North Yorkshire, England that links Thirsk with Scarborough through Hambleton, Helmsley, Kirkbysmoorside, Pickering.

The route has been in existence since prehistoric times and there are folk-tales about famous people from history using it. When turnpikes were installed between York and Coxwold and Ampleforth, drovers would take their cattle this way because it was wide enough and meant they avoided paying the tolls.

Settlements 
 Thirsk
 Sutton-Under-Whitestonecliffe
 (Sutton Bank)
 Sproxton
 Helmsley
 Beadlam
 Nawton
 Kirkbymoorside
 Wrelton
 Aislaby
 Middleton
 Pickering
 Thornton-le-Dale
 Allerston
 Ebberston
 Snainton
 West Ayton
 East Ayton
 Scarborough

Description of route 
The road begins at Thirsk, sprouting off from the A19 road and A168 junction with a short section north into the town before turning due east and going over the dualled A19. This section of road also includes a hairpin bend and the road rises  in under . There is a viewpoint and North York Moors National Park visitor centre at the top of the hill.

The road continues east across Scawton Moor for  before there is a 90° turn to the north and the B1257 joins from the south. Next is a short run northwards into Helmsley. Here the B1257 starts heading north-west and then north across the western edge of the moors to Stokesley. The A170 continues eastwards, following the corridor of the former railway between Helmsley and Pickering for  through Beadlam, Nawton, Kirkbymoorside, Wrelton, Aislaby and Middleton before arriving at Pickering. Just east of Pickering town centre is the junction with the A169 Malton to Whitby road.

The road continues eastwards out of Pickering, and just short of  it leaves the North York Moors National Park. The road carries on for  through Thornton-le-Dale, Allerston, Ebberston, Snainton, West Ayton and East Ayton, until there roughly parallel to the former Forge Valley railway, before arriving in Scarborough. It first meets the A171 from Middlesbrough then it has a junction with the A64 in the Falsgrave area of Scarborough town.

Safety 
The road itself has been described as High Risk. In 2001, the AA labelled the route as one of the most dangerous in Britain. Caravans have been prohibited from going either up or down Sutton Bank since May 1984 as the steep gradient and hairpin bend makes it dangerous for caravans and HGVs. There is an alternative route signposted through Coxwold and Ampleforth for banned vehicles. In an average year, 120 HGVs break down and another 400 suffer problems ascending or descending the route. New signage and the application of an anti-skid surface has improved the situation and seen a reduction of 23% of serious problems in the first year after the improvements.

Barkers Lane cross roads at Snainton is also listed as an accident blackspot.

Buses 
Some services travel between Helmlsey, Kirkbymoorside & Pickering, with the services from Pickering to Scarborough being the most frequent. No services travel the entire route from Thirsk to Scarborough along the length of the A170.

References

Roads in Yorkshire
Transport in North Yorkshire
Transport in Scarborough, North Yorkshire